William Richardson Davie was Governor of North Carolina.

William Davie may also refer to:

Sir William Davie, 4th Baronet (1662–1707)
Willie Davie (1925–1996), footballer

See also
William Davy (disambiguation)
William Davies (disambiguation)
Davie (disambiguation)